Florithrips traegardhi is a species of thrips. It is a pest of millets in India.

References

Thripidae
Insect pests of millets